Robert Adame Beltran (born November 19, 1953) is an American actor, known for his role as Commander Chakotay on the 1990s television series Star Trek: Voyager. He is also known for stage acting in California, and for playing Raoul Mendoza in the 1982 black comedy film Eating Raoul.

Early life
Beltran was born in Bakersfield, California, the son of Aurelia and Luis Beltran Perez, who were immigrants from Mexico. Beltran attended East Bakersfield High School and Bakersfield College. He has two sisters and seven brothers, including Latin Jazz musician Louie Cruz Beltran.

Career
Beltran graduated from California State University, Fresno with a degree in Theater Arts and moved to Los Angeles to begin his acting career. He had his first film role in Zoot Suit in 1981, but his breakthrough came in 1982 when he played the title character in the independently produced dark comedy Eating Raoul. Beltran had a supporting role as Chuck Norris' partner Trooper Kayo Ramos in the 1983 film Lone Wolf McQuade. He then starred in the 1984 TV movie The Mystic Warrior as Native American brave Ahbleza, and as Hector in 1984's Night of the Comet.

He played Commander Chakotay, the Native American first officer of the starship Voyager, in the science fiction television series Star Trek: Voyager from 1995 to 2001. During this time, he won the Nosotros Golden Eagle Award for Outstanding Actor in a Television Series in 1997. He was also nominated in 1996 for the NCLR Bravo Award for Outstanding Television Series Actor in a Crossover Role, and the ALMA Award for Outstanding Individual Performance in a Television Series in a Crossover Role in 1998 and 1999.

Beltran founded and co-directed the East LA Classic Theater Group. He is also a member of the Classical Theater Lab, an ensemble of professional actors who co-produced his production of Hamlet in 1997,  which he directed and starred in.

Beltran has collaborated with amateur actors in performing plays and scenes of plays of William Shakespeare. He produced and starred in a Los Angeles production of "The Big Knife" by Clifford Odets, a play which explores the Hollywood environment under the big studio system of the 1940s.

In May 2009, Beltran played the dual roles of Don Fermin and Older Eusebio in the American Conservatory Theaters staging of José Rivera's Boleros for the Disenchanted. He had the recurring role of Jerry Flute in Seasons 3 and 4 of HBO's Big Love.

Recordings
Latino Poetry Excerpts from a live performance by Beltran (recorded at the Museum of Latin American Art in Long Beach, California, April 2002)

Theater

Filmography

Film

Television

Video games

Notable awards and nominations

References

External links

1953 births
American male film actors
American male actors of Mexican descent
American male television actors
Bakersfield College alumni
California State University, Fresno alumni
Hispanic and Latino American male actors
Living people
Male actors from Bakersfield, California